Maysky is a rural locality (a selo) and the administrative center of Belgorodsky District of Belgorod Oblast, Russia. Population:   

It is on the M2 highway, 16 kilometers south-west of central Belgorod. It is the location of the Belgorod State Agricultural University.

References

Rural localities in Belgorodsky District